The Coup d'état of 9 Thermidor or the Fall of Maximilien Robespierre is the series of events beginning with Maximilien Robespierre's address to the National Convention on 8 Thermidor Year II (26 July 1794), his arrest the next day, and his execution on 10 Thermidor Year II (28 July 1794). In the speech of 8 Thermidor, Robespierre spoke of the existence of internal enemies, conspirators, and calumniators, within the Convention and the governing Committees. He refused to name them, which alarmed the deputies who feared Robespierre was preparing another purge of the Convention.

On the following day, this tension in the Convention allowed Jean-Lambert Tallien, one of the conspirators whom Robespierre had in mind in his denunciation, to turn the Convention against Robespierre and decree his arrest. By the end of the next day, Robespierre was executed in the Place de la Revolution, where King Louis XVI had been executed a year earlier. He was executed by guillotine, like the others.

Background

Purge of the Hébertists and Dantonists 

On 27 July 1793, Robespierre was elected to the Committee of Public Safety, and would remain a member until his death. During the months between September 1793 and July 1794, the Committee's power increased dramatically due to several measures instated during the Terror, such as Law of Suspects, and the latter Law of 14th Frimaire, becoming the de facto executive branch of the Revolutionary Government, under the supervision of the National Convention.

During this time, two different factions rose in opposition to the restructured Revolutionary Government: the left-wing ultra-revolutionaries and the moderate right-wing citra-revolutionaries. The Ultras (also known as Hébertists or Exagérés) gathered around Jacques Hébert, as well as leaders of the Paris Commune and the exagérés of the Cordeliers Club. They pushed for stronger repression measures than those already in place during the Terror, and campaigned for de-Christianization.

The Citras (also known as Dantonists or Indulgents), formed around Georges Danton as well as the indulgents members of the Cordeliers Club, including Camille Desmoulins. They were strongly opposed to the machinery of the Terror and policies of the Committee of Public Safety. Both these factions were charged as conspirators against the Revolutionary Government and sentenced to the guillotine: the Hébertists on 24 March (4 Germinal) and the Dantonists on 5 April (16 Germinal).

With these purges, the power of the Committee was reaffirmed. The death of Danton and Desmoulins, both formerly friends of Robespierre, left a deep toll on him. This, combined with the increasing demands of both the Committee on Public Safety and the National Convention washed away Robespierre's mental and physical health to the point he was forced to reduce his presence in the Jacobin Club and the National Convention.

Division within the Revolutionary Government 

Robespierre did not reappear in the National Convention until 7 May (18 Floréal). For this day he had planned a speech addressing the relationship between religion, morality, and the republican principles; and to establish the Cult of the Supreme Being in place of the Cult of Reason promoted by de-Christianizers like the Hébertists. Robespierre led the processions during the Festival in Honor of the Supreme Being celebrated on 8 June (20 Prairial). Although the festival was well accepted by the crowds, Robespierre's prominent position in it was suspicious in the eyes of some deputies, and muttering began about Robespierre's fanaticism and desire for power.

Two days after the Festival, on 10 June (22 Prairial), Robespierre pushed the National Convention to pass a new law drafted by him and Georges Couthon, which accelerated the trial process and extended the death penalty to include a new set of "enemies of the people"; this included those seeking to reestablish the monarchy, interfering with food provisions, discrediting the National Convention, and communicating with foreigners, among others. The fear of assassination drove Robespierre to take this measure: two assassination attempts against Robespierre and Collot d'Herbois had taken place on 23 and 24 May (4–5 Prairial), and the memory of Lepeletier's and Marat's murder still roused feelings in the Convention. The law was not universally accepted in the Convention, and critics of Robespierre and Saint-Just would use it against them during the events of 9 Thermidor.

More opposition came from the Committee of General Security, which had not been consulted over the contents of the Law. The Committee of General Security already felt threatened by the Committee of Public Safety's new ability to issue arrest warrants, as well as by the new Police Bureau, which was created by Saint-Just and was being run by Robespierre in his absence, and whose functions overlapped with that of the Committee of General Security. As payment, they presented a report on the ties between the English enemy and the self-proclaimed "Mother of God", Catherine Théot, who had prophesied that Robespierre was a new Messiah. This was done both with the intention of diminishing Robespierre, and to mock his religious positions and the Cult of The Supreme Being.

On 28 June (10 Messidor), Saint-Just returned from the northern front bearing news: the Revolutionary Army had defeated the Austrian army in Belgium at the Battle of Fleurus, securing the road to Paris. This victory signaled the end of the war against the Austrians, and with it, the end of the Terror government. Robespierre, wishing to get rid of both internal and external enemies, objected to the disbandment of the war government. The following day, in a joint meeting of the Committees of Public Safety and General Security, Lazare Carnot allegedly shouted at Saint-Just that both he and Robespierre were "ridiculous dictators". Following this event, Robespierre stopped participating directly in the deliberations of the Committee of Public Safety.

Having abandoned both the Committee and the National Convention, which he stopped frequenting after his presidency ended on 18 June (30 Prairial), Robespierre's absence allowed the breach between him and other members of the revolutionary government to widen. He did not reappear until 23 July (5 Thermidor), when he sat for another joint convention of the two Committees put forward in a failed attempt to resolve their mutual differences.

Events of the Fall

8 Thermidor (26 July 1794) 

During his absence from both the National Convention and the Committee of Public Safety through the months of June and July (Messidor), Robespierre prepared a speech to be delivered on 26 July (8 Thermidor). He delivered the speech first to the National Convention, and later that same day at the Jacobin Club. In it, he attempted both to defend himself from the rumors and attacks on his person that had been spreading since the start of the Reign of Terror; and to bring light to an anti-revolutionary conspiracy that he believed reached into the Convention and the Governing Committees.

Although he only accused three deputies by name (Pierre-Joseph Cambon, François René Mallarmé, and Dominique-Vincent Ramel-Nogaret), his speech seemed to also incriminate several others. Moreover, it was precisely because he failed to name the condemned that terror spread through the Convention as the deputies started thinking that Robespierre was planning yet another purge like that of the Dantonists and Hébertists.

Later the same day he presented the speech at the Jacobin Club, where it was received with overwhelming support despite some initial opposition. Both Jacques Nicolas Billaud-Varenne and Jean-Marie Collot d'Herbois, who opposed to the printing of the speech, were driven out of the Jacobin Club.

9 Thermidor (27 July 1794) 

 
In the morning of 27 July (9 Thermidor), Louis Antoine de Saint-Just started addressing the Convention without having shown his speech to the two Committees. He was interrupted by Tallien, who complained that both Robespierre and Saint-Just had broken with the Committees and now spoke only for themselves; and then by Billaud-Varenne, who related how he and Collot had been driven out of the Jacobin Club the previous day, and who accused Robespierre of conspiracy against the Convention. Robespierre attempted to defend himself, but was silenced by the commotion within the Convention and by the screaming deputies condemning him as a tyrant and conspirator.

The Convention then voted to arrest five deputies – Robespierre, his brother, Couthon, Saint-Just, and Le Bas – as well as François Hanriot, and other Robespierrist officials. They were taken before the Committee of General Security and sent to different prisons. None of the city prisons wanted to arrest the deputies and officials, and once a deputation from the Paris Commune, which had risen in support of Robespierre, arrived to the city prisons demanding they refuse to take in the arrested, the prison officials complied. A little after midnight, about fifty people, the five rebellious deputies, Dumas and Hanriot consulted on the first floor of the Hôtel de Ville.

10 Thermidor (28 July 1794) 

Upon receiving news that Robespierre and his allies had not been imprisoned, the National Convention, which was in permanent session, declared that Robespierre, Saint-Just, and the other deputies were outlaws, and commanded armed forces to enter the Hôtel de Ville. By 2:30 a.m., they had entered the Hôtel de Ville and made the arrest.

Robespierre was taken out of the Hôtel de Ville with a broken jaw. There are two conflicting accounts of how Robespierre was wounded: the first one puts forward that Robespierre had tried to kill himself with a pistol, and the second one is that he was shot by Charles-André Meda, one of the officers occupying the Hôtel de Ville. He, together with the surviving deputies and seventeen other prisoners considered to be loyal Robespierrists (including Hanriot) were brought to the Revolutionary Tribunal and condemned to death. He was guillotined at the same Place de la Révolution where his enemies King Louis XVI, Georges Danton, and Camille Desmoulins had been executed.

See also
 Thermidorian Reaction

Footnotes

Works cited

External links

Downfall of Robespierre
Downfall of Robespierre
Robespierre, Maximilien